A pidgin , or pidgin language, is a grammatically simplified means of communication that develops between two or more groups of people that do not have a language in common: typically, its vocabulary and grammar are limited and often drawn from several languages. It is most commonly employed in situations such as trade, or where both groups speak languages different from the language of the country in which they reside (but where there is no common language between the groups). Linguists do not typically consider pidgins as full or complete languages.

Fundamentally, a pidgin is a simplified means of linguistic communication, as it is constructed impromptu, or by convention, between individuals or groups of people. A pidgin is not the native language of any speech community, but is instead learned as a second language.

A pidgin may be built from words, sounds, or body language from a multitude of languages as well as onomatopoeia. As the lexicon of any pidgin will be limited to core vocabulary, words with only a specific meaning in the lexifier language may acquire a completely new (or additional) meaning in the pidgin.

Pidgins have historically been considered a form of patois, unsophisticated simplified versions of their lexifiers, and as such usually have low prestige with respect to other languages. However, not all simplified or "unsophisticated" forms of a language are pidgins. Each pidgin has its own norms of usage which must be learned for proficiency in the pidgin.

A pidgin differs from a creole, which is the first language of a speech community of native speakers that at one point arose from a pidgin. Unlike pidgins, creoles have fully developed vocabulary and patterned grammar. Most linguists believe that a creole develops through a process of nativization of a pidgin when children of acquired pidgin-speakers learn and use it as their native language.

Etymology 
Pidgin derives from a Chinese pronunciation of the English word business, and all attestations from the first half of the nineteenth century given in the third edition of the Oxford English Dictionary mean "business; an action, occupation, or affair" (the earliest being from 1807). The term pidgin English ("business English"), first attested in 1855, shows the term in transition to referring to language, and by the 1860s the term pidgin alone could refer to Pidgin English. The term was coming to be used in the more general linguistic sense represented by this article by the 1870s.

A popular false etymology for pidgin is English pigeon, a bird sometimes used for carrying brief written messages, especially in times prior to modern telecommunications.

Terminology 
The word pidgin, formerly also spelled pigion, used to refer originally to Chinese Pidgin English, but was later generalized to refer to any pidgin. Pidgin may also be used as the specific name for local pidgins or creoles, in places where they are spoken. For example, the name of the creole language Tok Pisin derives from the English words talk pidgin. Its speakers usually refer to it simply as "pidgin" when speaking English. Likewise, Hawaiian Creole English is commonly referred to by its speakers as "Pidgin".

The term jargon has also been used to refer to pidgins, and is found in the names of some pidgins, such as Chinook Jargon. In this context, linguists today use jargon to denote a particularly rudimentary type of pidgin; however, this usage is rather rare, and the term jargon most often refers to the words particular to a given profession.

Pidgins may start out as or become trade languages, such as Tok Pisin. Trade languages can eventually evolve into fully developed languages in their own right such as Swahili, distinct from the languages they were originally influenced by. Trade languages and pidgins can also influence an established language's vernacular, especially amongst people who are directly involved in a trade where that pidgin is commonly used, which can alternatively result in a regional dialect being developed.

Common traits 

Pidgins are usually less morphologically complex but more syntactically rigid than other languages, and usually have fewer morphosyntactic irregularities than other languages.

Characteristics shared by most pidgins:
 Typologically most closely resemble isolating languages
 Uncomplicated clausal structure (e.g., no embedded clauses, etc.)
 Reduction or elimination of syllable codas
 Reduction of consonant clusters or breaking them with epenthesis
 Elimination of aspiration or sound changes
 Monophthongization is common, employment of as few basic vowels as possible, such as 
 Lack of morphophonemic variation
 Lack of tones, such as those found in Niger-Congo, Austroasiatic and Sino-Tibetan language families and in various families of the indigenous languages of the Americas
 Lack of grammatical tense; use of separate words to indicate tense, usually preceding the verb
 Lack of conjugation, declension or agreement
 Lack of grammatical gender or number, commonly supplanted by reduplication to represent plurals and superlatives, and other parts of speech that represent the concept being increased and clear indication of the gender of animated objects.
 Lack of clear parts of speech or word categorization; common use and derivation of new vocabulary through conversion, e.g. nominalization, verbification, adjectivization etc.

Development 
The initial development of a pidgin usually requires:

 prolonged, regular contact between the different language communities
 a need to communicate between them
 an absence of (or absence of widespread proficiency in) a widespread, accessible interlanguage

Keith Whinnom (in ) suggests that pidgins need three languages to form, with one (the superstrate) being clearly dominant over the others.

Linguists sometimes posit that pidgins can become creole languages when a generation of children learn a pidgin as their first language,
a process that regularizes speaker-dependent variation in grammar. Creoles can then replace the existing mix of languages to become the native language of a community (such as the Chavacano language in the Philippines, Krio in Sierra Leone, and Tok Pisin in Papua New Guinea). However, not all pidgins become creole languages; a pidgin may die out before this phase would occur (e.g. the Mediterranean Lingua Franca).

Other scholars, such as Salikoko Mufwene, argue that pidgins and creoles arise independently under different circumstances, and that a pidgin need not always precede a creole nor a creole evolve from a pidgin. Pidgins, according to Mufwene, emerged among trade colonies among "users who preserved their native vernaculars for their day-to-day interactions". Creoles, meanwhile, developed in settlement colonies in which speakers of a European language, often indentured servants whose language would be far from the standard in the first place, interacted extensively with non-European slaves, absorbing certain words and features from the slaves' non-European native languages, resulting in a heavily basilectalized version of the original language. These servants and slaves would come to use the creole as an everyday vernacular, rather than merely in situations in which contact with a speaker of the superstrate was necessary.

Examples 
The following pidgins have Wikipedia articles or sections in articles. Many of these languages are commonly referred to by their speakers as "Pidgin". 

 List of English-based pidgins
 Algonquian–Basque pidgin
 Arafundi-Enga Pidgin
 Bamboo English
 Barikanchi Pidgin
 Basque–Icelandic pidgin
 Bimbashi Arabic
 Bislama (creolized)
 Borgarmålet
 Bozal Spanish
 Broken Oghibbeway
 Broken Slavey and Loucheux Jargon
 Broome Pearling Lugger Pidgin
 Camtho
 Cameroonian Pidgin English (creolized)
 Cocoliche
 Chinook Jargon 
 Duvle-Wano Pidgin
 Eskimo Trade Jargon
 Ewondo Populaire
 Fanagalo (Pidgin Zulu)
 Français Tirailleur 
 Haflong Hindi
 International Sign
 Inuktitut-English Pidgin
 Kiautschou Pidgin German
 KiKAR (Swahili pidgin)
 Kwoma-Manambu Pidgin
 Kyakhta Russian–Chinese Pidgin
 Kyowa-go and Xieheyu
 Labrador Inuit Pidgin French
 Madras Bashai
 Maridi Arabic
 Maritime Polynesian Pidgin
 Mediterranean Lingua Franca (Sabir)
 Mekeo pidgins
 Mobilian Jargon
 Namibian Black German
 Ndyuka-Tiriyó Pidgin
 Nefamese
 Nigerian Pidgin (creolized)
 Nootka Jargon
 Pidgin Delaware
 Pidgin Hawaiian
 Pidgin Iha
 Pidgin Ngarluma
 Pidgin Onin
 Pidgin Wolof
 Pijin (creolized)
 Roquetas Pidgin Spanish
 Russenorsk
 Settler Swahili
 Sranan Tongo
 Taimyr Pidgin Russian
 Tây Bồi Pidgin French
 Tinglish
 Te Parau Tinito
 Tok Pisin (creolized)
 Turku language
 West Greenlandic Pidgin
 Yokohama Pidgin Japanese
 Barikanchi Pidgin

See also 
 Bilingual pun
 Camfranglais (Cameroon)
 Creole language
 Engrish
 Hiri Motu
 International auxiliary language
 Lingua franca
 Macaronic language
 Mixed language
 Spanglish

Notes

References

Further reading
Holm, John (2000), An Introduction to Pidgins and Creoles, Cambridge University Press

External links 
Atlas of Pidgin and Creole Language Structures (APiCS)
Language Varieties Web Site

Interlinguistics
 Pidgin
Linguistics terminology